Darwin Falls is a waterfall located on the western edge of Death Valley National Park near the settlement of Panamint Springs, California. Although there exists a similarly named Darwin Falls Wilderness adjacent to the falls, the falls themselves are located in and administered by Death Valley National Park and the National Park Service. There are several falls, but they are mainly divided into the upper and lower, with a small grotto in between. At a combined , it is the highest waterfall in the park. The canyon is walled by dramatic plutonic rock.

Darwin Creek is one of the four perennial streams in three million-acre (12,000 km²) Death Valley National Park. Darwin Falls and Creek are fed by the Darwin Wash, which is in turn fed by the volcanic tableland of the Darwin Bench between the Inyo Mountains and the Argus Range. The small, narrow valley where the creek and falls are located features a rare collection of riparian greenery in the vast desert and is home to indigenous fauna such as quail.  The falls themselves support several small fern gullies.

Darwin Falls, the Darwin Falls Wilderness, the nearby town of Darwin, California, and all other areas named "Darwin" in the vicinity are named after Darwin French (1822–1902), a local rancher, miner, and explorer.

Access

Darwin Falls is accessible to the public. The falls are located in a small, narrow valley near Panamint Valley. While the trailhead is usually accessible with a 2WD vehicle, there is an option to drive with a 4WD vehicle to a spot farther along the path around the canyon. The upper falls are viewable with moderate climbing and some exposure.

A hike to Darwin Falls

References

Adventure Hikes and Canyoneering in the Southwest: Hike G9, Darwin Falls, Death Valley — (pictures of the upper falls included).
Todd's Desert Hiking Guide: Darwin Falls

Waterfalls of California
Landforms of Inyo County, California
Death Valley National Park
Protected areas of the Mojave Desert